The Painter is a 1982 Swedish film directed by Göran du Rées and Christina Olofson. It was entered into the 13th Moscow International Film Festival.

Cast
 Hans Mosesson as Stig Dahlman
 Kent Andersson as Eskil
 Anneli Martini as Mona
 Tomas Forssell as Factory worker
 Weiron Holmberg as Sune
 Hans Johansson as 'Tjocken'
 Mats Johansson as Factory worker
 Stellan Johansson as Bertil
 Jussi Larnö as 'Finnen'
 Sten Ljunggren as Supervisor
 Ingmar Nilsson as Factory worker
 Hans Wiktorsson as Åke

References

External links
 
 

1982 films
Swedish drama films
1980s Swedish-language films
Films directed by Göran du Rées
1980s Swedish films